Mulla-Ali is a rural locality (a selo) in Bolshezadoyevsky Selsoviet, Kizlyarsky District, Republic of Dagestan, Russia. The population was 64 as of 2010. There are 2 streets.

Geography 
Mulla-Ali is located 15 km northeast of Kizlyar (the district's administrative centre) by road, on the left bank of the Stary Terk River. Malaya Zadovka and Novogladovka are the nearest rural localities.

Nationalities 
Avars live there.

References 

Rural localities in Kizlyarsky District